Cybalomiinae is a subfamily of the lepidopteran family Crambidae. It was described by Hubert Marion in 1955.

Genera
Analcina Turner, 1911
Apoblepta Turner, 1911
Centropseustis Meyrick, 1890
Crambicybalomia Mey, 2011
Cybalomia Lederer, 1863 (= Cybolomia Romanoff, 1887)
Erpis Walker, 1863
Fredia Amsel, 1961
Goniophysetis Hampson, 1916 (= Leucinocrambus Viette, 1960)
Hendecasis Hampson, 1896 (= Neohendecasis Shibuya, 1931)
Hyperlais Marion, 1959 (= Hypolais Guenée, 1854)
Krombia Chrétien, 1911
Margaretania Amsel, 1961
Phenacodes Turner, 1937
Prochoristis Meyrick, 1890
Prolais Amsel, 1961
Ptychopseustis Meyrick, 1889
Stiphrometasia Zerny, 1914
Thyridiphora Warren, 1888 (= Thyridophora Hampson, 1896)
Trichophysetis Meyrick, 1884 (= Alpherakia Ragonot, 1890, Callinaias Warren in C. Swinhoe, 1890, Callinais C. Swinhoe, 1890, Crasigenes Meyrick, 1894, Puriella Strand, 1918, Puriella problematica Strand, 1918, Trichophyretis Pagenstecher, 1909, Trieropis Meyrick, 1886)

References

 , 2011: "New and little known species of Lepidoptera of southwestern Africa". Esperiana Buchreihe zur Entomologie Memoir 6: 146–261.
 , 1998: "The Scopariinae and Heliothelinae stat. rev. (Lepidoptera: Pyraloidea: Crambidae) of the Oriental Region- a revisional synopsis with descriptions of new species from the Philippines and Sumatra". Nachrichten entomologische Verein Apollo 17 Suppl.: 475–528.
  2009: "Transfer of All Western Hemisphere Cybalomiinae to Other Subfamilies (Crambidae: Pyraloidea: Lepidoptera): Elusia Schaus, Dichochroma Forbes, Schacontia Dyar, Cybalomia extorris Warren, and C. lojanalis (Dognin)". Proceedings of the Entomological Society of Washington 111 (2): 493–504.
 , 1960: "Pyrales nouvelles ou peu connues de Madagascar et Des Comores (Lepidoptera)". Annales de la Société Entomologique de France 129: 151–177.

 
Crambidae